Arriba! is an album from Caterina Valente and Silvio Francesco, released in the US, 1959. It is sung in Spanish.

Track listing
Side 1:

 Quizas, Quizas, Quizas
 Cha-Cha-Cha Flamenco
 La Mucura
 Una Aventura Mas
 Aquellos Ojos Verdes
 Somebody Bad Stole De Wedding Bell (Who's Got De Ding Dong)

Side 2:

 Un Poquito De Tu AmoR 
 El ManisEro (The Peanut Vendor) 
 Noche De RondA
 Dos Cruces
 Copacabana
 Casa Da Lolo

References

Caterina Valente albums
1959 albums
Collaborative albums
Decca Records albums
Spanish-language albums